Rhyopsocus is a genus of bird nest barklice in the family Psoquillidae. There are more than 20 described species in Rhyopsocus.

Species
These 24 species belong to the genus Rhyopsocus:

 Rhyopsocus afer (Badonnel, 1948)
 Rhyopsocus bentonae Sommerman, 1956
 Rhyopsocus bicornis Badonnel, 1986
 Rhyopsocus calakmulensis Garcia Aldrete, 1999
 Rhyopsocus celtis Mockford, 2016
 Rhyopsocus concavus Garcia Aldrete, 1987
 Rhyopsocus conformis Smithers, 1969
 Rhyopsocus confusus Turner, 1975
 Rhyopsocus disparilis (Pearman, 1931)
 Rhyopsocus eclipticus Hagen, 1876
 Rhyopsocus grandiphallus Turner, 1975
 Rhyopsocus maculosus Garcia Aldrete, 1984
 Rhyopsocus madagascariensis Badonnel, 1967
 Rhyopsocus micropterus Mockford, 1971
 Rhyopsocus nidicola Baz, 1990
 Rhyopsocus ocotensis Garcia Aldrete, 1999
 Rhyopsocus orthatus Thornton & Woo, 1973
 Rhyopsocus pandanicola Thornton, Lee & Chui, 1972
 Rhyopsocus peregrinus (Pearman, 1929)
 Rhyopsocus plesiafer Turner & Cheke, 1983
 Rhyopsocus quercus Mockford, 2016
 Rhyopsocus rafaeli Garcia Aldrete, 2004
 Rhyopsocus spheciophilus (Enderlein, 1903)
 Rhyopsocus texanus (Banks, 1930)

References

Trogiomorpha
Articles created by Qbugbot